Dhiloraj Ranjit Canagasabey (born 23 May 1955) is a Sri Lankan Tamil bishop who was the Anglican Bishop of Colombo in the Church of Ceylon from 14 May 2011 to 28 September 2020.

Early life and family
Canagasabey was born on 23 May 1955 in a Tamil family in Batticaloa, Ceylon. He was educated at the St. Michael's College National School.

Canagasabey is married to Harshini, a Sinhalese from Colombo. They have a daughter (Dhilukshini) and a son (Dhiranjan).

Career
 
After school Canagasabey joined the hospitality industry as management trainee at hotel school, later working at the Hotel Lanka Oberoi for five years. However, he later left the industry to study theology at the Theological College of Lanka, Pilimatalawa in 1977. He obtained Bachelor of Theology and Bachelor of Divinity degrees from the University of Serampore.

Canagasabey was ordained as a deacon on 27 May 1983 and a priest on 3 June 1983. After serving in several parishes he became Archdeacon of Nuwara Eliya on 17 December 1997. He was chaplain and acting headmaster of S. Thomas' College, Bandarawela. On 5 March 2011 the Diocesan Council of the Diocese of Colombo elected Canagasabey to be the 15th Church of Ceylon Anglican Bishop of Colombo. He was consecrated on 14 May 2011 at the Cathedral of Christ the Living Saviour, Colombo by  Rt Rev Duleep de Chickera, Vicar General and Arch Bishop’s Commissary - the outgoing Bishop, Rt Rev Shantha Francis, Presiding Bishop of the Church of Ceylon and Bishop of Kurunegala, Rt Rev. Paul Sarker, Bishop of Dhaka (as representative of the Archbishop of Canterbury, the Most Rev Dr Rowan Williams), Rt. Rev. Dr. Euyakim Mar Coorilos Episcopa, Bishop of the Mar Thoma Syrian Church of Malabar, Rt. Rev. John Packer, Bishop of Ripon and Leeds, retired bishops Rt Rev Andrew Kumarage, Rt Rev Kenneth Fernando and Rt Rev Kumara Illangasinghe.

References

1955 births
21st-century Anglican bishops in Asia
Alumni of St. Michael's College National School
Anglican bishops of Colombo
Living people
People from Batticaloa
Sri Lankan Tamil priests